Ioan Alexi (24 June 1800 – 29 June 1863) was a Romanian Greek Catholic hierarch. He was the first bishop of the new created Romanian Catholic Eparchy of Gherla, Armenopoli, Szamos-Ujvár from 1854 to 1863.

Biography
Born in Mălădia, Sălaj, Austrian Empire (present day – Romania) in 1800, he was ordained a priest on 30 October 1825. He was confirmed the Bishop by the Holy See on 16 November 1854. He was consecrated to the Episcopate on 28 October 1855. The principal consecrator was Archbishop Alexandru Sterca-Șuluțiu, the co-consecrators were Bishop Vasile Erdeli and Bishop Angelo Parsi.

He died in Gherla, Romania on 29 June 1863.

See also
Catholic Church in Romania

References 

1800 births
1863 deaths
19th-century Eastern Catholic bishops
Romanian Greek-Catholic bishops